Wemple is a surname of Dutch origin. Notable people with the surname include:

 Don Wemple (1917–1944), American football player
 Edward Wemple (1843–1920), American businessman and politician
 Erik Wemple (born 1964), American editor
 Jerry Wemple (born 1960), American poet
 William Wemple (lawyer, born 1912) (1912–2002), American lawyer
 William W. Wemple (1862–1933), New York politician
 William W. Wemple, Jr. (1898–1972), New York politician

References

Surnames of Dutch origin